Nándor Lengyel (6 June 1914 – 9 January 1968) was a Hungarian football manager. He managed the Luxembourg national football team, Schalke 04, Rot-Weiß Oberhausen and Wormatia Worms.

References

 

1914 births
1968 deaths
Luxembourg national football team managers
Hungarian football managers
Hungarian expatriate football managers
Expatriate football managers in Germany
Expatriate football managers in Luxembourg
Hungarian expatriate sportspeople in Germany
Hungarian expatriate sportspeople in Luxembourg
FC Schalke 04 managers
Rot-Weiß Oberhausen managers
Wormatia Worms managers